The flag and coat of arms of Normandy are symbols of Normandy, a region in north-western France.

Normandy
The traditional provincial flag, gules, two lions passant or, is used in both former regions of France: Lower Normandy and Upper Normandy. It is based on the design of arms which had been attributed by medieval heralds to William the Conqueror, ultimately related to the 12th-century coat of arms of the House of Anjou.

The red flag with two leopards is nicknamed les p'tits cats "the little cats" in Norman. The three-leopards version (known in the Norman language as les treis cats, "the three cats") may also be seen, which is based on the coat of arms of Richard I of England. The arms De gueules aux deux léopards d'or, armés et lampassés d'azur, passant l'un sur l'autre (Gules two leopards passant gardant in pale or armed and langued azure) was described by Jacques Meurgey in 1941.

In 1939 Jean Adigard des Gautries created the flag of Saint Olaf, a Nordic cross flag inspired by the Papal Cross borne on a standard by William the Conqueror. The Le Mouvement Normand adopted this flag in the 1970s, and it is used unofficially by some associations and individuals, especially those with an interest in the Viking origins of the Normans, although the Normans are also of Celtic (Belgae and Gauls) and Continental Germanic (Franks) origins. A flag combining the Saint-Olaf and the P'tit Cats, called the Croix de Falaise (Falaise cross) can sometimes be seen.

Channel Islands
The three-leopard is used by some associations and individuals, especially those who support reunification of the regions. Jersey and Guernsey use three leopards in their national symbols.

Ireland
Norman symbols can also be seen in Ireland, through the influence of Anglo-Norman noble families who settled in Ireland in the 12th and 13th centuries, following the Norman Invasion of Ireland.

See also
Angevin coat of arms
Coat of arms of England
List of coats of arms of the House of Plantagenet

References

External links
Description of the flag of Normandy

Flag and coat of arms
Normandy
Normandy
Flags displaying animals